Oleksandr Vasylyovych Tymchyk (born 20 January 1997) is a Ukrainian professional footballer who plays as a defender for Dynamo Kyiv and the Ukraine national team.

Career
Tymchyk is a product of the BRW-BIK Volodymyr-Volynskyi and FC Dynamo youth sportive schools. His first trainer was Ruslan Gan.

He spent his career in the Ukrainian Premier League Reserves and in October 2016 was promoted to the main-squad team. Tymchyk made his debut in the Ukrainian Premier League for club Dynamo Kyiv in a match against Dnipro as start-squad player on 6 November 2016.

International career
Tymchyk made his professional debut with the Ukraine in a 2–1 UEFA Nations League win over Switzerland on 3 September 2020.

Career statistics

Club

International goals

References

External links
 
 

1997 births
Living people
Ukrainian footballers
Ukraine international footballers
Ukraine youth international footballers
Ukraine under-21 international footballers
FC Dynamo Kyiv players
FC Stal Kamianske players
FC Zorya Luhansk players
Association football defenders
Ukrainian Premier League players
UEFA Euro 2020 players
Sportspeople from Vinnytsia Oblast